Elias Hoff Melkersen (born 31 December 2002) is a Norwegian professional footballer who plays for Dutch club Sparta Rotterdam, on loan from Scottish club Hibernian, as a striker.

Club career

Early career
Melkersen played in his native Norway with Bodø/Glimt, Hødd and Ranheim.

Hibernian
Melkersen signed for Scottish club Hibernian in January 2022. Melkersen's transfer was delayed due to work permit issues.

Melkersen and Norwegian compatriot Runar Hauge made their Hibernian debuts on 2 March 2022, both appearing as substitutes. Following the match, and a later injury to Kevin Nisbet, Hibernian manager Shaun Maloney praised Melkersen's hard work and told him to 'step up' to first-team football. On 13 March 2022, Melkersen scored a brace in his first start for Hibernian, both proving decisive in the club's 2–1 win in the Scottish Cup quarter-finals against Motherwell.

Melkersen moved on loan to Dutch club Sparta Rotterdam in January 2023.

International career
Melkersen is a Norwegian youth international, representing them at under-17, under-18 and under-20 levels.

Career statistics
.

References

2002 births
Living people
Sportspeople from Trøndelag
People from Stjørdal
Norwegian footballers
IL Stjørdals-Blink players
FK Bodø/Glimt players
IL Hødd players
Ranheim Fotball players
Hibernian F.C. players
Sparta Rotterdam players
Norwegian Fourth Division players
Norwegian Third Division players
Norwegian Second Division players
Norwegian First Division players
Scottish Professional Football League players
Association football forwards
Norway youth international footballers
Norwegian expatriate footballers
Norwegian expatriate sportspeople in Scotland
Expatriate footballers in Scotland
Norwegian expatriate sportspeople in the Netherlands
Expatriate footballers in the Netherlands